Sir William Sandys ( – 28 October 1628) was an English politician, MP for Winchester.

Sandys was the only son of Sir Walter Sandys  and his wife Mabel, daughter of Thomas Wriothesley, 1st Earl of Southampton.

On 22 November 1596 he married Elizabeth, daughter of Sir William Cornwallis . They had no offspring.

Sandys was knighted on 22 July 1601. He served as a JP in Hampshire from 1604, a freeman and alderman of Winchester from 1607, Commissioner of Gaol Delivery for Winchester from 1612, and High Sheriff of Hampshire 1611–12.

He was elected MP for Winchester in the Addled Parliament of 1614.

Sandys died on 28 October 1628, and was buried at Mottisfont.

References

1570s births
1628 deaths
English MPs 1614
English justices of the peace
High Sheriffs of Hampshire
Knights Bachelor